Surgeon general is a title used in several Commonwealth countries and most NATO nations to refer either to a senior military medical officer or to a senior uniformed physician commissioned by the government and entrusted with public health responsibilities. The title originated in the 17th century, as military units acquired their own physicians.

In the United Kingdom, the Surgeon-General is the head of the military medical services. The post is held by the senior of the three individual service medical directors and carries the rank of vice admiral, lieutenant general, or air marshal.

In the United States, the chief public health officer is the Surgeon General of the United States, and a small number of states have state surgeons general. Moreover, three of the U.S. military services have their own surgeon general, namely the Surgeon General of the United States Army, Surgeon General of the United States Navy, and Surgeon General of the United States Air Force.

See also
 Chief Medical Officer (Ireland)
 Chief Medical Officer (United Kingdom)
 Committee of Chiefs of Military Medical Services in NATO
 Generalarzt
 Generaloberstabsarzt
 Surgeon General (Canada)
 Surgeon General of the United States
 Surgeon General of the United States Air Force
 Surgeon General of the United States Army
 Surgeon General of the United States Navy
 Surgeon-General of the Swedish Armed Forces
 Surgeon-General (United Kingdom)

Military medicine